Lucas Daniel Romero (born 18 April 1994) is an Argentine footballer who is a midfielder for Liga MX club León.

Early life
Romero was born and raised in a humble neighborhood in Loma Hermosa, Greater Buenos Aires. He started playing youth football in Vélez Sársfield when he was 7 years old.

Club career

Vélez Sársfield
Romero made his debut for Vélez Sársfield in 2012 at 18 years of age, coming on as a substitute in a 0–0 draw with Estudiantes de La Plata. In his first season with the first team, Romero helped Vélez to win the 2012 Inicial championship, playing 13 games (including 4 as a starter replacing injured Francisco Cerro). The midfielder also entered the field in Vélez's victory over Newell's Old Boys for the 2012–13 Superfinal and was a starter in his team's victory over Arsenal de Sarandí for the 2013 Supercopa Argentina. In 2016, Romero was transferred to Cruzeiro Esporte Clube.

Cruzeiro
After a difficult start to his Cruzeiro career, Romero began gaining a lot of attention for his versatility playing in many different positions. Lucas Romero then became part of the first 11 playing either as a right-back or on his main position of defensive midfielder.

In Cruzeiro, Romero formed of what became known as "La Banda", along with former Vélez Sarsfield star Ariel Cabral and Uruguay wonderkid Giorgian De Arrascaeta.

Independiente
On 5 August 2019 Romero signed with Independiente.

International career
Romero played with the Argentina national under-20 football team the 2013 South American Youth Championship, in which his team was eliminated in the first round.

Career statistics

Honours
Vélez Sársfield
Argentine Primera División (2): 2012 Inicial, 2012–13 Superfinal
Supercopa Argentina (1): 2013
Cruzeiro 
Copa do Brasil: 2017, 2018
Campeonato Mineiro (1): 2018 Campeonato Mineiro

References

External links
 Profile official website 
 Argentine Primera statistics at Fútbol XXI  
 

1994 births
Living people
Argentine footballers
Association football midfielders
Argentine Primera División players
Club Atlético Vélez Sarsfield footballers
Campeonato Brasileiro Série A players
Cruzeiro Esporte Clube players
Club Atlético Independiente footballers
Footballers at the 2016 Summer Olympics
Olympic footballers of Argentina
Argentine expatriate footballers
Argentine expatriate sportspeople in Brazil
Expatriate footballers in Brazil
Sportspeople from Buenos Aires Province